Le Mans, Shortcut to Hell (also known as Summer Love) is a 1970 Italian action film directed by Osvaldo Civirani.

Plot

Cast 

Lang Jeffries as John Lee Scott
Erna Schürer as Sheila
 Maurizio Bonuglia as  Dustin Rich
Edwige Fenech as  Cora
 Gaetano Imbrò as Kurt Weiß
Franco Pesce as  Agostino Bonelli

See also 
List of Italian films of 1970

References

External links

1970 films
1970 action films
Italian action films
Films directed by Osvaldo Civirani
Films scored by Stelvio Cipriani
Italian auto racing films
24 Hours of Le Mans
1970s Italian films